José Aguilar Álvarez (1902–1959) was a Mexican physician.

Education and career
He began his studies at the French School and concluded in the National Preparatory School. In March 1923 he took his professional examinations for his surgical doctor degree.

In 1925 he began his teaching career, teaching topographical anatomy class at the National School of Medicine.

In July 1938, the University Council appointed him director of the National School of Medicine, a position he held until July 1942.
In response to the call issued by the rector, Samuel Ramirez, a large group of college counselors, seven of the fifteen directors and counselors most teachers and students met to elect president on August 3, 1944. This Council, which was considered a legitimate successor of the legally constituted board, appointed Jose Aguilar as rector of the National University.

Conflict with the university
Four days after Álvarez's appointment, President Manuel Ávila Camacho, decided to ask both the rector and the rector ephemeral, Manuel Gual Vidal, appointed by the University Council, to resign, as they had been appointed a compromise board which would assume the government of the institution and restore the university organization.

See also
 Manuel Gual Vidal (Transient Rector)

 National Autonomous University of Mexico

References

20th-century Mexican physicians
1902 births
1959 deaths
Academic staff of the National Autonomous University of Mexico
People from Mexico City